Herman van den Eerenbeemt (born 12 August 1962) is a Dutch rower. He won a gold medal at the 1989 World Rowing Championships in Bled with the men's quadruple sculls.

References

1962 births
Living people
Dutch male rowers
World Rowing Championships medalists for the Netherlands
Olympic rowers of the Netherlands
Rowers at the 1984 Summer Olympics
Rowers at the 1988 Summer Olympics
Rowers from Amsterdam